Teichmann or Teichman is a surname of German and Yiddish origin ( for pond; ; taykh for river).

Teichmann is the surname of:
Axel Teichmann (born 1979), German cross-country skier
Gary Teichmann (born 1967), South African rugby union player
Jil Teichmann (born 1997), Spanish-born Swiss tennis player
Josef Teichmann (born 1972), Austrian mathematician
Karl Teichmann (1897–1927), First World War flying ace
Ludwik Teichmann (1823–1895), Polish anatomist
Max Teichmann (1924–2008), Australian academic and political commentator
Richard Teichmann (1868–1925), German chess player
Roland Teichmann, director of the Austrian Film Institute

Teichman is the surname of:
Arthur Murray (born Moses Teichman, 1895–1991), dance instructor and businessman
Eric Teichman (1884–1944), British politician
Jenny Teichman (1930–2018), Australian/British philosopher, wife of Max Teichmann
German toponymic surnames